Good Souls: The Greatest Hits is the first greatest hits album by UK indie rock band Starsailor, released on 18 September 2015. The album contains hits from between Love Is Here (2001) and All the Plans (2009) and two new tracks: "Give Up the Ghost" and "Hold On".

Release 
The album was released on 18 September 2015 and was accompanied by a UK tour.

Track listing

Personnel
 James Walsh – lead vocals, guitar
 Ben Byrne – drums 
 James Stelfox – bass 
 Barry Westhead – keyboards

Charts

References

2015 greatest hits albums
Starsailor (band) albums
Parlophone compilation albums